Kółko i krzyżyk (Tic Tac Toe, literally translated as Circle and Cross) was probably the first Polish game show, where people could win a Belweder TV set. The show's scenarist was Ryszard Serafinowicz, the host was Bolesław Kielski, the questions were thought up by Juliusz Owidzki, the show's vision assistant was Joanna Rostowska, the set decorator of the first series was Jan Laube, and the director of the show was Stanisław Taczanowski.  In the game show, contestants were answering questions from a nine-field board. If the answer was correct, the player could put a symbol on the board. The show was broadcast from 1961 to 1975 on TVP.

Polish game shows

pl:Teleturnieje nadawane w TVP1#Kółko i krzyżyk